Hyacinthoides italica, the Italian bluebell or Italian squill, is a spring-flowering bulbous perennial plant belonging to the family Asparagaceae.

It is one of around 11 species in the genus Hyacinthoides, others including the common bluebell (Hyacinthoides non-scripta) in northwestern Europe, and the Spanish bluebell (Hyacinthoides hispanica) further west in the Iberian Peninsula.

Description
The stem is leafless. The inflorescence is a dense, conical or pyramid-like raceme with 5-30 bright violet-blue star-like flowers. The flowers have two narrow bracts. Flowering period extends from February to May.

It is in some respects intermediate between the common and Spanish species in having slender leaves (as in H. non-scripta or even slenderer), but a dense raceme of flowers (as in H. hispanica; not sparse and one-sided as in H. non-scripta).

H. italica is sometimes used as an ornamental plant. It has gained the Royal Horticultural Society's Award of Garden Merit.

Distribution
This species is native to the central Mediterranean region, in northwestern Italy, in western Liguria, in southern France, and in northeastern Spain.

Habitat

Gallery

References

Notes

General references
Huxley, A. (1992). New RHS Dictionary of Gardening vol. 2: 604. Macmillan.

italics
Plants described in 1753
Taxa named by Carl Linnaeus